Patrick Lipinski (born 17 July 1998) is a professional Australian rules footballer playing for the Collingwood Football Club in the Australian Football League (AFL). He previously played for the Western Bulldogs from 2017 to 2021.

Playing career
He was drafted by the Western Bulldogs with their second selection and twenty-eighth overall in the 2016 national draft. He made his debut in the nine point loss against Hawthorn in round twenty-three of the 2017 season.

He was officially traded on 11 October.

Statistics
Updated to the end of the 2022 season.

|-
| 2017 ||  || 27
| 1 || 0 || 3 || 6 || 12 || 18 || 4 || 1 || 0.0 || 3.0 || 6.0 || 12.0 || 18.0 || 4.0 || 1.0 || 0
|- 
| 2018 ||  || 27
| 17 || 12 || 5 || 113 || 137 || 250 || 48 || 41 || 0.7 || 0.3 || 6.7 || 8.1 || 14.7 || 2.8 || 2.4 || 0
|-
| 2019 ||  || 27
| 14 || 11 || 4 || 137 || 170 || 307 || 65 || 50 || 0.8 || 0.3 || 9.8 || 12.1 || 21.9 || 4.6 || 3.6 || 0
|-
| 2020 ||  || 27
| 13 || 5 || 4 || 90 || 121 || 211 || 32 || 30 || 0.4 || 0.3 || 6.9 || 9.3 || 16.2 || 2.5 || 2.3 || 0
|-
| 2021 ||  || 27
| 11 || 2 || 1 || 27 || 33 || 60 || 11 || 7 || 0.3 || 0.0 || 6.8 || 8.3 || 15.0 || 2.8 || 1.8 || 0
|-
| 2022 ||  || 1
| 25 || 9 || 4 || 273 || 278 || 551 || 86 || 92 || 0.4 || 0.2 || 10.9 || 11.1 || 22.0 || 3.4 || 3.7 || 4
|- class=sortbottom
! colspan=3 | Career
! 81 !! 39 !! 21 !! 693 !! 797 !! 1490 !! 274 !! 236 !! 0.5 !! 0.3 !! 8.6 !! 9.8 !! 18.4 !! 3.4 !! 2.9 !! 4
|}

Notes

References

External links

1998 births
Living people
Western Bulldogs players
Collingwood Football Club players
Northern Knights players
Australian rules footballers from Victoria (Australia)